Mahadevapuram is a village in Madhira mandal, Khammam district, Telangana, India, about  from Madhira town. There is a famous ancient temple in the village called Venugopalaswamy.

References

Villages in Khammam district